Richard Almgill Harrison (April 8, 1824July 30, 1904) was a nineteenth-century politician and lawyer from Ohio.

Born in Thirsk, North Yorkshire, England, Harrison immigrated to the United States with his parents in 1832, settling in Ohio. He attended public schools, graduated from the Cincinnati Law School in 1846 and was admitted to the bar the same year, commencing practice in London, Ohio. He was a member of the Ohio House of Representatives in 1858 and 1859 and was a member of the Ohio Senate in 1860 and 1861. Harrison was elected a Unionist to the United States House of Representatives to fill a vacancy in 1861, serving from 1861 to 1863. Afterward, he continued practicing law in Columbus, Ohio until his death there on July 30, 1904. He was a named a member of the Supreme Court Commission of Ohio in 1876 but refused to serve. He was interred in Kirkwood Cemetery in London, Ohio.

On December 21, 1847, Harrison was married at London, Ohio to Maria Louisa Warner, and had three daughters and four sons.

References

External links

1824 births
1904 deaths
Members of the Ohio House of Representatives
Presidents of the Ohio State Senate
Members of the United States House of Representatives from Ohio
Ohio lawyers
People from Thirsk
Lawyers from Columbus, Ohio
People from London, Ohio
British emigrants to the United States
Ohio Unionists
University of Cincinnati College of Law alumni
Unionist Party members of the United States House of Representatives
19th-century American politicians
Politicians from Columbus, Ohio